Vijay Yesudas (born 23 March 1979) is an Indian playback singer and actor. He has sung over 1000 film songs. Vijay works predominantly in the South Indian film industry, mostly in Malayalam, Telugu, Tamil, Kannada, and Hindi. He is the son of acclaimed singer K. J. Yesudas.

Vijay made his debut as a singer with the 2000 Malayalam film Millennium Stars, which had music composed by Vidyasagar. Vijay Yesudas won three Kerala State Film Awards for Best Singer for the songs "Kolakkuzhal Vili Ketto" in Nivedyam (2007), "Akaleyo Nee" in Grandmaster and "Mazhakondu Mathram" in Spirit (2012), and "Poomuthole" in Joseph (2018). He has also won five Filmfare Awards for Best Singer and four SIIMA Awards for Best Male Playback Singer. He made a foray into acting by playing the villain role in the Tamil film Maari (2015) and the lead role in the Tamil film Padaiveeran (2018).

Early life
Vijay Yesudas was born to singer K. J. Yesudas and Prabha. He is the second son in the family, having an elder brother named Vinod and a younger one, Vishal. He is the grandson of stage singer Augustine Joseph. He studied in Chennai until 9th grade and went to the U.S. for further studies. He graduated from Florida International University with a BA in music.

Career
Vijay Yesudas started learning Carnatic music in the early 1997. He is popular for songs sung under composer Yuvan Shankar Raja. He has collaborated with various other composers such as Dakshinamoorthy Swami, Ilaiyaraja, A. R. Rahman, Raveendran, Hamsalekha, Deva, Ouseppachan, Vidyasagar, Mani Sharma, M. M. Keeravani, and Mohan Sitara along with new-generation composers such as Karthik Raja, M. Jayachandran, Sabesh–Murali, Harris Jayaraj, G. V. Prakash Kumar, D. Imman, Srikanth Deva, and Deepak Dev.

Vijay made his playback debut in the 2000 Malayalam film Millennium Stars, on the composition of Vidyasagar. He won the Kerala State Film Award for Best Singer for "Kolakkuzhal Vili Ketto" in Nivedyam (2007). Vijay made his acting debut in the 2010 Malayalam film Avan. In 2013, he won his second Kerala State Film Award for Best Singer for "Akaleyo Nee" in Grandmaster and "Mazhakondu Mathram" in Spirit (2012). In 2015, Vijay sang "Malare" in the Malayalam film Premam, went viral among young audiences. The song was often shared soon after its video release, he also had another successful song, "Hemnathamen Kaikumbili" from Kohinoor. That year, he also acted as villain in the commercially successful Tamil film Maari. His performance received appreciation. He has sung 178 Malayalam songs and 118 Tamil songs.

Personal life

Vijay met his future wife Darshana at a music concert held in Dubai on 2002 Valentine's Day. After five years of dating, he married Darshana in 2007 at Trivandrum. They have a daughter, Ammeya, and a son, Avyan.

Awards
Kerala State Film Awards:
 2007– Best Singer – Nivedyam – "Kolakkuzhal Vili Ketto"
 2012– Best Singer – Grandmaster – "Akaleyo Nee", Spirit – "Mazhakondu Mathram"
 2018– Best Singer – Joseph – "Poomuthole"
Filmfare Awards South:
 2011 – Filmfare Award for Best Male Playback Singer – Malayalam – Indian Rupee – "Ee Puzhayum"
 2012 – Filmfare Award for Best Male Playback Singer – Malayalam – Spirit – "Mazhakondu Mathram"
 2013 – Filmfare Award for Best Male Playback Singer – Malayalam  – Memories – "Thirayum Theeravum"
 2015 – Filmfare Award for Best Male Playback Singer – Malayalam  – Premam – "Malare Ninne"
 2018 - Filmfare Award for Best Male Playback Singer – Malayalam - Joseph – "Poomuthole"

IIFA Utsavam:
2016–1st IIFA Utsavam for playback singer male – Malayalam
2017–2nd IIFA Utsavam for playback singer male – Malayalam
Nandi Awards:
2014–Nandi Award for Best Male Playback Singer for the song "Nee Kanti Choopullo" from Legend
South Indian International Movie Awards:
2012–SIIMA Award for Best Male Playback Singer – ee Puzhayum
2013–SIIMA Award for Best Male Playback Singer – "Mazha Kondu 2014 – SIIMA Award for Best Male Playback Singer – "Thirayum Theeramum" 
2016–SIMA Award for Best Male Playback Singer – MalareAsiavision Awards:
 2011– Asiavision Awards – Best Male Singer
 2013 – Asiavision Awards – Best Male Singer
 2015 – Asiavision Awards – Best Male Singer
Asianet Film Awards:
 2012 – Asianet Film Award – Best Male Singer
 2013 – Asianet Film Award – Best Male Singer
 2015– Asianet Film Award – Best Male Singer
Vanitha Film Awards:
2012 – Best singer male
2016 – Best singer male
2018 – Best singer male
Edison Awards (India):
2014-Best Male Playback singer
North American Film Awards:
2016-Best Male singer - Premam and Ennu Ninte Moideen''
2018-Best Male singer
Anand TV awards:
2016-Best Male singer
CERA BIG Malayalam Music Awards:
 2014 – CERA BIG Malayalam Music Awards – Best Male Singer
Mangalam Music awards
2017 – Best Playback Singer
Flowers Music awards
2018 – Best Playback Singer

Discography

Telugu discography

Malayalam discography (partial)

Kannada discography

Tamil discography

Hindi discography

Filmography

See also
 List of Indian playback singers

References

External links

 
 
 
 Complete Analysis of Vijay Yesudas' Malayalam career from MSI/MMDb Encyclopedia 
 
 Chronological listing of film songs sung by Vijay Yesudas in Tamil, Malayalam and Kannada language, categorised by song title

Bollywood playback singers
Telugu playback singers
Malayalam playback singers
Indian male playback singers
Singers from Kochi
Tamil playback singers
Kannada playback singers
20th-century Indian singers
Malayali people
Living people
Film musicians from Kerala
Kerala State Film Award winners
Filmfare Awards South winners
21st-century Indian singers
20th-century Indian male singers
1979 births
21st-century Indian male singers